The 1832 United States presidential election was the 12th quadrennial presidential election, held from November 2 to December 5, 1832. Incumbent president Andrew Jackson, candidate of the Democratic Party, defeated Henry Clay, candidate of the National Republican Party.

The election saw the first use of the presidential nominating conventions, and the Democrats, National Republicans, and the Anti-Masonic Party all used conventions to select their candidates. Jackson won re-nomination with no opposition, and the 1832 Democratic National Convention replaced Vice President John C. Calhoun with Martin Van Buren. The National Republican Convention nominated a ticket led by Clay, a Kentuckian who had served as Secretary of State under President John Quincy Adams. The Anti-Masonic Party, one of the first major U.S. third parties, nominated former Attorney General William Wirt.

Jackson faced heavy criticism for his actions in the Bank War, but remained popular among the general public. He won a majority of the popular vote and 219 of the 286 electoral votes, carrying most states outside New England. Clay won 37.4% of the popular vote and 49 electoral votes, while Wirt won 7.8% of the popular vote and carried the state of Vermont. Virginia Governor John Floyd, who had not actively campaigned, won South Carolina's electoral votes. After the election, members of the National Republican Party and the Anti-Masonic Party formed the Whig Party, which became the Democrats' primary opponent over the next two decades. 

Jackson proved to be the only Democratic president to be re-elected until Woodrow Wilson, 84 years later.

Nominations
With the demise of the Congressional nominating caucus in the election of 1824, the political system was left without an institutional method on the national level for determining presidential nominations. For this reason, the candidates of 1832 were chosen by national conventions. The first national convention was held by the Anti-Masonic Party in Baltimore, Maryland, in September 1831. The National Republican Party and the Democratic Party soon imitated them, also holding conventions in Baltimore, which would remain a favored venue for national political conventions for decades.

Democratic Party 

President Jackson and Vice President Calhoun had a strained relationship for a number of reasons, most notably a difference in opinion about the Nullification Crisis and the involvement of Calhoun's wife Floride in the Eaton affair. As a result, Secretary of State Martin Van Buren and Secretary of War John H. Eaton resigned from office in April 1831, and Jackson requested the resignation of all other cabinet officers except one. Van Buren instigated the procedure as a means of removing Calhoun supporters from the Cabinet. Calhoun further aggravated Jackson in the summer of 1831 when he issued his "Fort Hill Letter," in which he outlined the constitutional basis for a state's ability to nullify an act of Congress. The final blow to the Jackson-Calhoun relationship came when Jackson nominated Van Buren to serve as Minister to Great Britain and the vote in the Senate ended in a tie, which Calhoun broke by voting against confirmation on January 25, 1832.

In January it was not clear who the Democrats' candidates would be in the election later that year. Jackson had already been nominated by several state legislatures, following the pattern in 1824 and 1828, but he worried that the various state parties would not unite on a vice-presidential nominee. As a result, the Democratic Party followed the pattern of the opposition and called a national convention.

The 1832 Democratic National Convention, the Democratic Party's first, was held in the Athenaeum in Baltimore (the same venue as the two opposition parties) from May 21 to May 23, 1832. Several decisions were made at the convention. On the first day, a committee was appointed to provide a list of delegates from each state. This committee, later called the Credentials Committee, reported that all states were represented. Delegates were present from the District of Columbia, and on the first contested roll call vote in convention history, the convention voted 126–153 to deprive the District of Columbia of its voting rights in the convention. The Rules Committee gave a brief report that established several other customs. Each state was allotted as many votes as it had presidential electors; several states were overrepresented and many were underrepresented. Second, balloting was taken by states and not by individual delegates. Third, two-thirds of the delegates would have to support a candidate for nomination, a measure intended to reduce sectional strife. The fourth rule, which banned nomination speeches, was the only one the party quickly abandoned.

No roll call vote was taken to nominate Jackson for a second term. Instead, the convention passed a resolution stating that "we most cordially concur in the repeated nominations which he has received in various parts of the union." Martin Van Buren was nominated for vice president on the first ballot, receiving 208 votes to 49 for Philip P. Barbour and 26 for Richard Mentor Johnson. Afterward, the convention approved an address to the nation and adjourned.

Barbour Democrats 
The Barbour Democratic National Convention was held in June 1832 in Staunton, Virginia. Jackson was nominated for president and Philip P. Barbour for vice president. Barbour withdrew, but the ticket appeared on the ballot in Alabama, Georgia, Mississippi, North Carolina, and Virginia.

National Republican Party 

Soon after the Anti-Masonic Party held its national convention, supporters of Henry Clay called a national convention of the National Republican Party. 18 of the 24 states sent delegations to the convention, which convened on December 12, 1831. The convention was attended by 168 delegates from eighteen states although one-fourth of the delegates were late due to winter weather.

On the convention's fourth day, the roll call ballot for president took place. The chairman of the convention called the name of each delegate, who gave his vote orally. Clay received 155 votes, with delegate Frederick H. Shuman of North Carolina abstaining because he believed that Clay could not win and should wait until 1836. As additional delegates arrived, they were allowed to cast their votes for Clay, and by the end of the convention he had 167 votes to one abstention. A similar procedure was used for the vice-presidential ballot. Former Congressman John Sergeant of Pennsylvania was nominated with 64 votes to six abstentions. A prominent Philadelphia attorney with connections to the Second Bank of the United States and a reputation as an opponent of slavery, Sergeant gave the ticket geographical balance.

Anti-Masonic Party 

The first national nominating convention for a presidential candidate in American history was held by the Anti-Masonic Party in Baltimore, Maryland from September 26–28, 1831. The convention was attended by 116 delegates from thirteen states with Maryland being the furthest state in the South represented. The leaders of the party attempted to give the presidential nomination to Clay and Supreme Court Justice John McLean, but both declined.

Several prominent politicians were considered for the presidential nomination. Richard Rush would have been the nominee, but pointedly refused. As a result of this action, along with his softness toward Jackson, former President John Quincy Adams never forgave him. Adams was willing to run as the Anti-Masonic candidate, but the party leaders did not want to risk running someone so unpopular.

The delegates met behind closed doors for several days before the convention officially opened, making some initial decisions. Several unofficial presidential ballots and one official ballot were taken, in which William Wirt defeated Rush and John McLean for the nomination. Ironically, Wirt was a Mason and even defended the Order in a speech before the convention that nominated him. Wirt hoped for an endorsement from the National Republicans. When the National Republican Party nominated Henry Clay, Wirt's position became awkward. He did not withdraw, even though he had no chance of being elected.

The convention was organized on September 26 and heard reports of its committees on the 27th. The 28th was spent on the official roll call for president and vice president. During the balloting, each delegate's name was called, after which that delegate placed a written ballot in a special box. Wirt was nominated for president with 108 votes to one for Rush and two abstentions. Amos Ellmaker was nominated for vice president with 108 votes to one for John C. Spencer (chairman of the convention) and two abstentions.

Nullifier Party
While the South Carolina state legislature remained nominally under Democratic control, it refused to support Jackson's reelection due to the ongoing Nullification Crisis, and instead opted to back a ticket proposed by the Nullifier Party led by John C. Calhoun. The Nullifiers were made up of former members of the Democratic-Republican Party who had largely supported Jackson at the previous election, but were much stauncher proponents of states' rights, which ultimately led them to repudiate Jackson during his first term. Calhoun himself declined to head the ticket, instead nominating Governor of Virginia John Floyd, who also opposed Jackson's stance on states' rights. Merchant and economist Henry Lee was nominated as Floyd's running mate.

Ultimately, Floyd's candidacy amounted to little more than a protest against Jackson, as his ticket did not run in any state outside of South Carolina. He nonetheless received all the state's electoral votes.

General election

Campaign
The election campaign revolved around the Second Bank of the United States. Jackson, who disliked banks and paper money in general, vetoed the renewal of the Bank's charter and withdrew federal deposits from the bank. Clay hoped to divide Jackson's supporters and curry favor in Pennsylvania, the bank's headquarters, by attacking Jackson. His supporters criticized Jackson's use of presidential veto power, portraying him as "King Andrew."

However, the attacks on Jackson generally failed, in spite of heavy funding by the bank, as Jackson convinced the ordinary population that he was defending them against a privileged elite. Jackson campaign events were marked by enormous turnout, and he swept Pennsylvania and the vast majority of the country.

Results

Jackson won the election in an electoral college landslide. Jackson received 219 electoral votes, defeating Clay (49), Floyd (11), and Wirt (7) by a large margin.

Jackson's popularity with the American public and the vitality of the political movement with which he was associated is confirmed by the fact that no president was again able to secure a majority of the popular vote in two consecutive elections until Ulysses S. Grant in 1872. To date, only two other presidents from the Democratic party were ever able to replicate this feat: Franklin D. Roosevelt (for the first time in 1936) and Barack Obama (in 2012). Furthermore, no president succeeded in securing re-election again until Abraham Lincoln in 1864.

As of 2020, Jackson was the second of seven presidential nominees to win a significant number of electoral votes in at least three elections, the others being Thomas Jefferson, Henry Clay, Grover Cleveland, William Jennings Bryan, Franklin D. Roosevelt, and Richard Nixon. Of these, Jackson, Cleveland, and Roosevelt also won the popular vote in at least three elections. 

Jackson was the second of only five presidents to win re-election with a smaller percentage of the popular vote than in prior elections, the other four are James Madison in 1812, Grover Cleveland in 1892, Franklin Roosevelt in 1940 and 1944 and Barack Obama in 2012.

Following the election and Clay's defeat, an Anti-Jackson coalition would be formed out of National Republicans, Anti-Masons, disaffected Jacksonians, and small remnants of the Federalist Party whose last political activity was with them a decade before. In the short term, it formed the Whig Party in a coalition against President Jackson and his reforms.

(a) The popular vote figures exclude South Carolina where the Electors were chosen by the state legislature rather than by popular vote.
(b) 66,706 Pennsylvanians voted for the Union slate, which represented both Clay and Wirt. These voters have been assigned to Wirt and not Clay.
(c) All of John Floyd's electoral votes came from South Carolina where the Electors were chosen by the state legislatures rather than by popular vote.
(d) Two electors from Maryland for Clay failed to cast votes.

Results by state
The 1832 presidential election results, by state, are displayed in the map below.

{| class="wikitable sortable" style="text-align:right"
|-
! colspan=2 |
! align=center colspan=3 | Andrew JacksonDemocratic
! align=center colspan=3 | Henry ClayNational Republican
! align=center colspan=3 | William WirtAnti-Masonic
! align=center colspan=3 | John FloydNullifier
! colspan="2" |Margin
! align=center colspan=2 | State Total
|-
! align=center | State
! style="text-align:center; font-size: 60%" | electoralvotes
! align=center | #
! align=center | %
! style="text-align:center; font-size: 60%" | electoralvotes
! align=center | #
! align=center | %
! style="text-align:center; font-size: 60%" | electoralvotes
! align=center | #
! align=center | %
! style="text-align:center; font-size: 60%" | electoralvotes
! align=center | #
! align=center | %
! style="text-align:center; font-size: 60%" | electoralvotes
! align=center | #
! align=center | %
! align=center | #
!
|-
! style"text-align:left" | Alabama
! 7
| 0001361814,286
| 99.97
| 7
| 000486695
| 0.03
| -
| colspan=3 align=center | no ballots
| colspan=3 align=center | no ballots
|14,281
|99.94
| 14,291
! AL
|-
! style"text-align:left" | Connecticut
! 8
| 11,269
| 34.32
| -
| 18,155
| 55.29
| 8
| 3,409
| 10.38
| -
| colspan=3 align=center | no ballots
| -6,886
| -20.97
| 32,833
! CT
|-
! style"text-align:left" | Delaware
! 3
| 4,110
| 49.01
| -
| 4,276
| 50.99
| 3
| colspan=3 align=center | no ballots
| colspan=3 align=center | no ballots
| -166
| -1.98
| 8,386
! DE
|-
! style"text-align:left" | Georgia
! 11
| 20,750
| 100
| 11
| colspan=3 align=center | no ballots
| colspan=3 align=center | no ballots
| colspan=3 align=center | no ballots
|20,750
|100.00
| 20,750
! GA
|-
! style"text-align:left" | Illinois
! 5
| 14,609
| 68.01
| 5
| 6,745
| 31.40
| -
| 97
| 0.45
| -
| colspan=3 align=center | no ballots
|7,864
|36.61
| 21,481
! IL
|-
! style"text-align:left" | Indiana
! 9
| 31,551
| 67.10
| 9
| 15,472
| 32.90
| -
| colspan=3 align=center | no ballots
| colspan=3 align=center | no ballots
|16,079
|34.20
| 47,023
! IN
|-
! style"text-align:left" | Kentucky
! 15
| 36,292
| 45.51
| -
| 43,449
| 54.49
| 15
| colspan=3 align=center | no ballots
| colspan=3 align=center | no ballots
| -36,249
| -8.98
| 79,741
! KY
|-
! style"text-align:left" | Louisiana
! 5
| 3,908
| 61.67
| 5
| 2,429
| 38.33
| -
| colspan=3 align=center | no ballots
| colspan=3 align=center | no ballots
|1,479
|23.34
| 6,337
! LA
|-
! style"text-align:left" | Maine
! 10
| 33,978
| 54.67
| 10
| 27,331
| 43.97
| -
| 844
| 1.36
| -
| colspan=3 align=center | no ballots
|6,647
|10.70
| 62,153
! ME
|-
! style"text-align:left" | Maryland-1{{efn|Clay won 4 Electors in District 1, but 2  were too ill to vote.}}
! 4
| 5,097
| 37.60
| -
| 8,458
| 62.40
| 2
| colspan=3 align=center | no ballots| colspan=3 align=center | no ballots| -3,361
| -24.79
| 13,555
! MD1
|-
! style"text-align:left" | Maryland-2
! 2
| 5,025
| 54.19
| 2
| 4,248
| 45.81
| -
| colspan=3 align=center | no ballots| colspan=3 align=center | no ballots|777
|8.38
|9,273
! MD2
|-
! style"text-align:left" | Maryland-3
! 1
| 2,900
| 100
| 1
| colspan=3 align=center | no ballots| colspan=3 align=center | no ballots| colspan=3 align=center | no ballots|2900
|100
|2900
! MD3
|-
! style"text-align:left" | Maryland-4
! 3
| 6,129
| 41.70
| -
| 6,454
| 51.29
| 3
| colspan=3 align=center | no ballots| colspan=3 align=center | no ballots| -325
| -2.58
| 12,583
! MD4
|-
! style"text-align:left" | Massachusetts
! 14
| 13,933
| 20.61
| -
| 31,963
| 47.27
| 14
| 14,692
| 21.73
| -
| colspan=3 align=center | no ballots| -10,737
| -25.54
| 67,619
! MA
|-
! style"text-align:left" | Mississippi
! 4
| 5,750
| 100
| 4
| colspan=3 align=center | no ballots| colspan=3 align=center | no ballots| colspan=3 align=center | no ballots|5,750
|100.00
| 5,750
! MS
|-
! style"text-align:left" | Missouri
! 4
| 5,192
| 100
| 4
| colspan=3 align=center | no ballots| colspan=3 align=center | no ballots| colspan=3 align=center | no ballots|5,192
|100.00
| 5,192
! MO
|-
! style"text-align:left" | New Hampshire
! 7
| 24,855
| 56.67
| 7
| 18,938
| 43.24
| -
| colspan=3 align=center | no ballots| colspan=3 align=center | no ballots|5,917
|13.43
| 43,793
! NH
|-
! style"text-align:left" | New Jersey
! 8
| 23,826
| 49.89
| 8
| 23,466
| 49.13
| -
| 468
| 0.98
| -
| colspan=3 align=center | no ballots|360
|0.76
| 47,760
! NJ
|-
! style"text-align:left" | New York
! 42
| 168,497
| 52.10
| 42
| 154,896
| 47.90
| -
| colspan=3 align=center | no ballots| colspan=3 align=center | no ballots|13,601
|4.20
| 323,393
! NY
|-
! style"text-align:left" | North Carolina
! 15
| 25,261
| 84.77
| 15
| 4,538
| 15.23
| -
| colspan=3 align=center | no ballots| colspan=3 align=center | no ballots|20,723
|69.54
| 29,799
! NC
|-
! style"text-align:left" | Ohio
! 21
| 81,246
| 51.33
| 21
| 76,539
| 48.35
| -
| 509
| 0.32
| -
| colspan=3 align=center | no ballots|4,707
|2.98
| 158,294
! OH
|-
! style"text-align:left" | Pennsylvania
! 30
| 91,949
| 57.96
| 30
| colspan=3 align=center | no ballots| 66,689
| 42.04
| -
| colspan=3 align=center | no ballots|25,260
|15.92
| 158,638
! PA
|-
! style"text-align:left" | Rhode Island
! 4
| 2,126
| 43.07
| -
| 2,810
| 56.93
| 4
| colspan=3 align=center | no ballots| colspan=3 align=center | no ballots| -684
| -13.86
| 4,936
! RI
|-
! style"text-align:left" | South Carolina
! 11
| colspan=3 align=center | no popular vote| colspan=3 align=center | no popular vote| colspan=3 align=center | no popular vote| colspan=2 align=center | no popular vote| 11
| -
| -
| -
! SC
|-
! style"text-align:left" | Tennessee
! 15
| 28,078
| 95.42
| 15
| 1,347
| 4.58
| -
| colspan=3 align=center | no ballots| colspan=3 align=center | no ballots|26,731
|90.84
| 29,425
! TN
|-
! style"text-align:left" | Vermont
! 7
| 7,870
| 24.50
| -
| 11,152
| 34.71
| -
| 13,106
| 40.79
| 7
| colspan=3 align=center | no ballots| -5,236
| -6.08
| 32,128
! VT
|-
! style"text-align:left" | Virginia
! 23
| 34,243
| 74.96
| 23
| 11,436
| 25.03
| -
| 3
| 0.01
| -
| colspan=3 align=center | no ballots|22,807
|49.92
| 45,682
! VA
|-
! TOTALS:
! 288
! 702,735
! 54.74
! 219
! 474,107
! 36.93
! 49
! 99,817
! 7.78
! 7
! -
! -
! 11
! 228,628
! 17.81
! 1,276,659
! US
|-
! TO WIN:
! 145
! colspan="17" |
|}

Close states

States where the margin of victory was under 1%:
New Jersey 0.76% (360 votes)

States where the margin of victory was under 5%:
Delaware 1.98% (166 votes)
Maryland's 4th District 2.58% (325 votes)
Ohio 2.98% (4,707 votes)
New York 4.20% (13,601 votes)

States where the margin of victory was under 10%:
Vermont 6.08% (5,236 votes)
Maryland's 2nd District 8.38% (777 votes)
Kentucky 8.98% (36,249 votes)

Tipping point states:
Maine 10.70% (6,647 votes) (tipping point state for a Jackson victory)
Pennsylvania 15.90% (25,260 votes) (tipping point state for a Clay victory)

Electoral College selection

See also
 Second inauguration of Andrew Jackson
 History of the United States (1789–1849)
 1832–33 United States House of Representatives elections
 1832–33 United States Senate elections

Notes

References

Bibliography
 Belko, William S. "Toward the Second American Party System: Southern Jacksonians, the Election of 1832, and the Rise of the Democratic Party." Ohio Valley History 14.1 (2014): 28–50. online
 Cheathem, Mark R. The Coming of Democracy: Presidential Campaigning in the Age of Jackson (2018)
 Cole, Donald B. "The Presidential Election of 1832 in New Hampshire." Historical New Hampshire 21#1 (1966) pp: 32–50.
 Eriksson, Erik McKinley. "Official Newspaper Organs and Jackson's Re-election, 1832." Tennessee Historical Magazine 9.1 (1925): 37-58 online.
 Folsom, Burton W. "Party Formation and Development in Jacksonian America: The Old South." Journal of American Studies 7#3 (1973): 217–229.
 
 Holt, Michael F. The Rise and Fall of the American Whig Party: Jacksonian Politics and the Onset of the Civil War (Oxford University Press, 1999)
 Remini, Robert V. Henry Clay: Statesman for the Union (1993)
 Remini, Robert V. Andrew Jackson and the Course of American Freedom 1822-1832 (1981), detailed biography
 Remini, Robert V. "Election of 1832." in Arthur M. Schlesinger, Jr. ed. History of American Presidential Elections (1968) vol 1 pp 494–516, Detailed coverage plus primary source
Ward, John William.(1955) Andrew Jackson, Symbol for an Age. New York: Oxford University Press.

Primary sources
 Presidential Election of 1832: A Resource Guide from the Library of Congress
 
  Note: the account of the convention in Niles' Weekly Register has more information than the printed proceedings.
 The proceedings of the United States Anti-Masonic Convention: held at Philadelphia, September 11, 1830.''

Websites
 
 
 source for "Electoral college selection"

External links

 Election of 1832 in Counting the Votes 

 
Presidency of Andrew Jackson
Andrew Jackson
Martin Van Buren
Henry Clay
November 1832 events
December 1832 events